Dominik Javorček (born 2 November 2002) is a Slovak professional footballer who currently plays for Fortuna Liga club MŠK Žilina as a defender.

Club career

MŠK Žilina
Javorček made his Fortuna Liga debut for Žilina against AS Trenčín at pod Dubňom on 15 August 2020. Javorček appeared directly in the starting-XI. He was booked with a yellow card in the 68th minute and was replaced by Jakub Kiwior eight minutes later with the score at 2:3 in favour of Šošoni. Vahan Bichakhchyan had sealed the 2:4 win in the stoppage time. He scored his first Fortuna Liga goal in an away defeat to Spartak Trnava.

References

External links
 MŠK Žilina official club profile
 
 Futbalnet profile
 

2002 births
Living people
Sportspeople from Bojnice
Slovak footballers
Slovakia youth international footballers
Slovakia under-21 international footballers
Association football defenders
MŠK Žilina players
2. Liga (Slovakia) players
Slovak Super Liga players